The 1926 Howard Bison football team was an American football team that represented Howard University during the 1926 college football season. In their second year under head coach Louis L. Watson, the Bison compiled a 7–0 record, shut out six of seven opponents, and outscored all opponents by a total of 199 to 6. The team was recognized as the 1926 black college football national champion.

Key players included quarterback Jack Coles, captain and tackle H. Vernon Smith, halfback Edgar Ross, halfback Clarence "Tick" Smith, center Milton "Biff" Martin, and fullback Jack Young.

Schedule

References

Howard
Howard Bison football seasons
Black college football national champions
College football undefeated seasons
Howard Bison football